Pine Hill (formerly, Tigerville, Pine's Hill, and East Sunnyside) is an unincorporated community in Humboldt County, California. The area is now part of unincorporated Eureka.

The name honors Safford E. Pine, local dairy farmer.

References

Unincorporated communities in Humboldt County, California
Unincorporated communities in California